Charlie Richards (16 August 1910 – 3 May 1990) was an Australian rules footballer who played with Footscray in the Victorian Football League (VFL).

Richards was recruited from Moe Football Club and returned there in 1934.

Notes

External links 

1910 births
1990 deaths
Australian rules footballers from Victoria (Australia)
Western Bulldogs players